was a Japanese editor and photographer, known for photographing Tokyo for over half a century.

Kuwabara was born in Tokyo in 1913. He started taking photographs around 1931 with a Vest Pocket Kodak, but his interest increased as a result of an invitation by his neighbor Hiroshi Hamaya to go to a photo-shoot in Kamakura. His photograph, taken with a Leica C, won second prize in the related contest, leading him to submit his work to photographic magazines, which accepted them.

In 1940, he went to Manchuria to take photographs for military purposes.

He returned after the war and became editor of the magazine Camera and thereafter edited other photographic magazines, putting the nurture of new talent and photographic criticism ahead of his own photography.

Kuwabara's own photographs received more critical attention from the late 1960s, but the revival in his work only took off in the mid-1970s. He came to be regarded as one of the foremost street photographers, particularly among those active before the war. While his earlier photographs of Tokyo had concentrated on Asakusa and elsewhere in the Shitamachi (area traditionally populated by artisans), his later photographs (many in color) show Setagaya-ku, where he later lived.

Nobuyoshi Araki did much to promote the revival of interest in Kuwabara's works, and the pair had a joint exhibition, "Love you Tokyo", in the Setagaya Art Museum in summer 1993.

Kuwabara died on 10 December 2007, a fact that was only announced in February 2008.

Books of Kuwabara's photographs

  Tōkyō Shōwa jūichinen  (Tokyo 1936). Tokyo: Shōbunsha, 1974. Photographs taken 1935–9 (and for the most part 1936–7) in Tokyo — particularly Shitaya-ku and Asakusa-ku — and nearby places such as Kamakura. Texts and captions in Japanese only.
  Manshū Shōwa jūgonen  (Manchuria 1940). Tokyo: Shōbunsha, 1974. 
Watakushi no shashinshi. Tokyo: Shōbunsha, 1976.
Yume no machi: Kuwabara Kineo Tōkyō shashinshū ). Tokyo: Shōbunsha, 1977.
Tōkyō chōjitsu: Kuwabara Kineo shashinshū / Tokyo Days. Sonorama Shashin Sensho 15. Tokyo: Asahi Sonorama, 1978. Photographs of Tokyo, with an emphasis on the 1970s. With a summary in English as well as Japanese.
Tōkyō 1934–1993. Tokyo: Shinchōsha, 1995. Edited by Kazuo Nishii. There are 736 photographs, many of them two to a (rather small) page. The paper and printing quality are not of art-book quality; nevertheless, this book scores on sheer quantity. Short captions in English, longer captions and other texts in Japanese only.
Kuwabara Kineo shashinten: Tōkyō Shōwa modan(). Tokyo: Higashi Nihon Tetsudō Bunka Zaidan, 1995.
 Kuwabara Kineo (Kineo Kuwabara). Nihon no Shashinka 19. Tokyo: Iwanami, 1998. . Photographs 1934–97. Captions and text in Japanese only.
 Kuwabara Kineo: Raika to Tōkyō: Raika sutōrī bukku / Kineo Kuwabara: Tokyo through a Leica. Issue no. 60 (2001) of Kamera Rebyū: Kurashikku Kamera Senka. . Most of this issue of this lavishly produced quarterly is devoted to Kuwabara's works. Despite the alternative English title, the text is in Japanese only.
 Tōkyō Shitamachi 1930 (1930, Downtown Tokyo 1930). Tokyo: Kawade Shobō, 2006. .
Rabu yū Tōkyō. Tokyo: Setagaya Art Museum, 1993. Catalogue of an exhibition held with Nobuyoshi Araki at the Setagaya Art Museum. 
Kineo Kuwabara's Photographs: Tokyo Sketches of 60 Years. Selected Works from the Collection of Setagaya Art Museum. Tokyo: Setagaya Art Museum, 2014. Edited by Miki Tsukada and Naohiro Takahashi. Captions and other texts by Tadayasu Sakai and Tsukada in Japanese and English, translated by Louisa Rubinfien.

Other books with photographs by Kuwabara
Modan Tōkyō rapusodi  / Rhapsody of Modern Tokyo. Tokyo: Tokyo Metropolitan Museum of Photography, 1993. Catalogue of an exhibition held in 1993 of photographs of Tokyo from the 1930s at the Tokyo Metropolitan Museum of Photography. Pages 60–85 are devoted to Kuwabara's works.

Exhibition
Kineo Kuwabara’s Photographs: Tokyo Sketches of 60 Years, Setagaya Art Museum, Tokyo, April-June 2014. 200 photographs from throughout his career, from the collection of the Setagaya Art Museum.

Notes

References

External links
'The Lost Metropolis': 1930s Tokyo street life – in pictures The Guardian, 2019

1913 births
Japanese photographers
Street photographers
Photography in China
People from Tokyo
2007 deaths
Japanese magazine editors